Alvaradoa jamaicensis is a species of plant in the Picramniaceae family. It is endemic to Jamaica.

References

Picramniales
Vulnerable plants
Endemic flora of Jamaica
Taxonomy articles created by Polbot